Patrick Walsh (born December 26, 1975) is an entrepreneur and investor in the United States. He is the founder and CEO of PW Partners, LLC, an investment management firm.

Early life and education

Walsh studied economics at Wesleyan University and played football and baseball until he suffered a severe back injury playing football. He transferred to Boston College after his freshman year and graduated with a degree in accounting. After graduation, he earned the Chartered Financial Analyst designation.

Early business career
Walsh worked from 1998 to 2004 at Prudential Capital Group and Prudential Securities in real estate private equity and equity research; from 2004 to 2008 at Deutsche Bank as an investment banker and at a private hedge fund based in Chicago from 2008 to 2011.

A 2014 article in Restaurant Finance Monitor stated that "each of the chains with which he has become involved have thrived on Wall Street in his wake."

In 2018 Walsh won the New York region of the 2018 Ernst & Young Entrepreneur of the Year Award.

References

1975 births
Living people
People from San Diego
People from Foxborough, Massachusetts
Wesleyan University alumni
Boston College alumni
American chief executives of financial services companies
CFA charterholders